Zabranjeno Pušenje is a garage rock band from formed in Sarajevo (then Yugoslavia, now Bosnia and Herzegovina), closely associated with the New Primitivism cultural movement and the radio and television satire show Top Lista Nadrealista. They were one of the most popular musical acts of the 1980s in Yugoslavia, selling hundreds of thousands of records. Band was formed 1980, contrary to the then prevalent punk rock and new wave, Zabranjeno Pušenje created a distinctive garage rock sound with folk influences, often featuring innovative production and complex story-telling. Many times they went into trouble with authorities for their, usually mild and sympathetic, criticism of the socialist system.

Currently, the band consists of founding member, vocalist and guitarist Sejo Sexon, longtime drummer Branko Trajkov, guitarist Toni Lović, bassist Dejan Orešković, and violinist and keyboardist Robert Boldižar.

Members

Current members 
, the lineup of Zabranjeno Pušenje includes one vocalist, one guitarist, one bassist, one drummer & percussionist, and one violinist & keyboardist.

Source: Zabranjeno Pušenje

Former members 
The former members of Zabranjeno Pušenje consist of three vocalists, ten guitarists, four drummers, six keyboardists, two saxophonists, and per one violinist, trombonist, and percussionist.

Timeline

Lineups

References

External links
 Official website

Zabranjeno pušenje